Douglas Miller is an American politician. He serves as a Republican member for the 48th district of the Indiana House of Representatives.

In 2014, Miller was elected for the 48th district of the Indiana House of Representatives, succeeding Timothy Neese. Miller assumed office on November 5, 2014.

References 

Living people
Place of birth missing (living people)
Year of birth missing (living people)
Republican Party members of the Indiana House of Representatives
21st-century American politicians